Maja Ma is a 2022 Indian Hindi-language drama film directed by Anand Tiwari. It stars Madhuri Dixit, Gajraj Rao, Ritwik Bhowmik, Barkha Singh, Srishti Shrivastava and Simone Singh. The film premiered on 6 October 2022 on Amazon Prime Video.

Plot 
Pallavi Patel is a simple housewife living in a housing society and is famous for her cooking and dance. Her husband, Manohar Patel, is the chairman of the society. Pallavi's daughter is working towards her PhD in sexuality and gender identity. She is also an ally and an activist for LGBTQIA+ rights. Her son, who lives in America, is in love with Esha Hansraj. Pallavi's family is her world. But when Pallavi is questioned about her sexuality, her world and her family start to fall apart.

Cast 
 Madhuri Dixit as Pallavi Patel
 Simran Nerurkar as young Pallavi
 Gajraj Rao as Manohar Patel
 Ritwik Bhowmik as Tejas Patel, Pallavi and Manohar Patel's son
 Barkha Singh as Esha Hansraj, Tejas Patel's fiancée and Bob Hansraj's daughter
 Srishti Shrivastava as Tara Patel Adhia, Pallavi and Manohar Patel's daughter
 Simone Singh as Kanchan Adhia, Tara's mother-in-law and Pallavi's ex-girlfriend 
 Khushi Khanna as young Kanchan
 Rajit Kapoor as Bob Hansraj, Esha Hansraj's father
 Sheeba Chaddha as Pam Hansraj, Bob Hansraj's wife 
 Malhar Thakar as Pinakin Adhia, Tara's husband
 Khushi Hajare as Kinjal
 Ninad Kamat as Moolchand Adhia, Tara's father-in-law
 Krunal Pandit as Dr Ankit Patel
 Aarti Ashar as Society Women 2

Soundtrack 

The music for the film is composed by Siddharth Mahadevan, Souumil Shringarpure, Gourov Dasgupta and Anurag Sharma while the lyrics are written by Priya Saraiya, Kumaar, Anurag Sharma and Lil Sidley.

Reception
Upon release, Maja Ma received mixed reviews from the film critics, who praised Dixit's performance but criticized the sanitised plot of the film. The film currently holds a rating of 6.2/10 on IMDb.

Rachana Dubey from The Times of India gave a rating of 3.5/5 and described the film as "A conscious effort to navigate the internal conflicts that the various characters feel, with Pallavi's sudden relevation." Manik Sharma from Firstpost wrote, "Pallavi’s sexuality is a matter of public debate long before, she takes the brave step to contemplate what is being said. This knotty moral conundrum that Pallavi must confront as a personal journey, is the highlight of a film that can often oscillate between massy tropes and meaningful depths." Shweta Keshri from India Today gave Maja Ma a rating of 2/5 and wrote, "Madhuri Dixit carries the film on her shoulders and Gajraj Rao delivers a flawless performance. The film dealt with the topic sensitively and not made a mockery of it. However, the film's ending is disappointing".

References

External links 
 
 

2020s Hindi-language films
Indian drama films
2022 drama films
Amazon Prime Video original films
2020s Indian films
Lesbian-related films
Indian LGBT-related films
2022 LGBT-related films